Costică Dafinoiu (6 February 1954 – 8 June 2022) was a light-heavyweight boxer from Romania. He took up boxing in 1969, winning a bronze medal at the 1976 Olympics, a gold and a silver medals at the Romanian National Amateur Boxing Championship and won the Golden belt international tournament organized by Romania in 1974. He retired in 1981, and after receiving a degree in physical education worked as a boxing coach at his native club CS Progresul Brăila.

References

External links 

 
 
 
 
 

1954 births
2022 deaths
People from Brăila County
Light-heavyweight boxers
Boxers at the 1976 Summer Olympics
Olympic boxers of Romania
Olympic bronze medalists for Romania
Olympic medalists in boxing
Romanian male boxers
Medalists at the 1976 Summer Olympics